Cryptanthus dianae is a plant species in the genus Cryptanthus. This species is endemic to Brazil.

Cultivars
 Cryptanthus 'Ruby Ryde'

References

BSI Cultivar Registry Retrieved 11 October 2009

dianae
Flora of Brazil